Jon Cox is an American politician from the state of Utah. He is a member of the Republican Party and served as a member of the Utah House of Representatives until he resigned in 2015 to work as Governor Gary R. Herbert's director of communications.

Education
Cox earned a Bachelor of Arts in communications from Utah State University and a Master of Arts in history from the University of Utah.

Career 
Cox worked in the office of Bob Bennett when he served in the United States Senate as a constituent liaison for five years. He then worked at Snow College as an assistant professor of history.

Cox was elected as a Sanpete County Commissioner in 2012, succeeding his fourth cousin, Spencer Cox, when Spencer was elected to the Utah House of Representatives. Republican Party delegates chose Jon Cox to succeed Spencer as the member of the Utah House for the 58th district following his appointment as Lieutenant Governor of Utah, and he was appointed by Gary Herbert on November 15.

During the 2014 General Session, he served on the House Business and Labor Committee as well as the House Political Subdivisions Committee.

In July 2015, Cox resigned to serve as communications director and senior adviser for Governor Herbert. After serving for one year, he became the vice president of government affairs at Rocky Mountain Power in September 2016. He was succeeded by communications consultant Aimee Edwards.

Personal life 
He currently lives in Ephraim, Utah.

References

External links

 Don't Delay SB 54, an Op-Ed published by Representative Cox in the Utah Policy Daily, February 3, 2015, discussing the so-called Count My Vote compromise adopted by the Utah Legislature and signed into law in 2014.
 Biography at Ballotpedia

Living people
People from Ephraim, Utah
Republican Party members of the Utah House of Representatives
County commissioners in Utah
Snow College faculty
Place of birth missing (living people)
Year of birth missing (living people)
Political staffers